In algebra, a prime ideal is a subset of a ring that shares many important properties of a prime number in the ring of integers. The prime ideals for the integers are the sets that contain all the multiples of a given prime number, together with the zero ideal.

Primitive ideals are prime, and prime ideals are both primary and semiprime.

Prime ideals for commutative rings
An ideal  of a commutative ring  is prime if it has the following two properties:

  is not the whole ring .

This generalizes the following property of prime numbers, known as Euclid's lemma: if  is a prime number and if  divides a product  of two integers, then  divides  or  divides . We can therefore say

A positive integer  is a prime number if and only if  is a prime ideal in

Examples

 A simple example: In the ring  the subset of even numbers is a prime ideal.

 Given an integral domain , any prime element  generates a principal prime ideal . Eisenstein's criterion for integral domains (hence UFDs) is an effective tool for determining whether or not an element in a polynomial ring is irreducible. For example, take an irreducible polynomial  in a polynomial ring  over some field . 

 If  denotes the ring  of polynomials in two variables with complex coefficients, then the ideal generated by the polynomial  is a prime ideal (see elliptic curve).

It consists of all those polynomials whose constant coefficient is even.

Every maximal ideal is in fact prime. In a principal ideal domain every nonzero prime ideal is maximal, but this is not true in general. For the UFD  Hilbert's Nullstellensatz states that every maximal ideal is of the form 

Non-examples 
 Consider the composition of the following two quotients

Although the first two rings are integral domains (in fact the first is a UFD) the last is not an integral domain since it is isomorphic to

showing that the ideal  is not prime. (See the first property listed below.)

 Another non-example is the ideal  since we have
 
but neither  nor  are elements of the ideal.

Properties
 An ideal  in the ring  (with unity) is prime if and only if the factor ring  is an integral domain. In particular, a commutative ring (with unity) is an integral domain if and only if  is a prime ideal.  (Note that the zero ring has no prime ideals, because the ideal (0) is the whole ring.)
 An ideal  is prime if and only if its set-theoretic complement is multiplicatively closed.
 Every nonzero ring contains at least one prime ideal (in fact it contains at least one maximal ideal), which is a direct consequence of Krull's theorem.
This can be further generalized to noncommutative rings (see below). Another prototypical m-system is the set,  of all positive powers of a non-nilpotent element.
 The preimage of a prime ideal under a ring homomorphism is a prime ideal.  The analogous fact is not always true for maximal ideals, which is one reason algebraic geometers define the spectrum of a ring to be its set of prime rather than maximal ideals; one wants a homomorphism of rings to give a map between their spectra.
 The set of all prime ideals (called the spectrum of a ring) contains minimal elements (called minimal prime ideals). Geometrically, these correspond to irreducible components of the spectrum.
 The sum of two prime ideals is not necessarily prime. Their sum  however is not prime:  but its two factors are not. Alternatively, the quotient ring has zero divisors so it is not an integral domain and thus  cannot be prime. 
 Not every ideal which cannot be factored into two ideals is a prime ideal; e.g.  cannot be factored but is not prime.
 In a commutative ring  with at least two elements, if every proper ideal is prime, then the ring is a field. (If the ideal  is prime, then the ring  is an integral domain.
 A nonzero principal ideal is prime if and only if it is generated by a prime element. In a UFD, every nonzero prime ideal contains a prime element.

Uses
One use of prime ideals occurs in algebraic geometry, where varieties are defined as the zero sets of ideals in polynomial rings. It turns out that the irreducible varieties correspond to prime ideals. In the modern abstract approach, one starts with an arbitrary commutative ring and turns the set of its prime ideals, also called its spectrum, into a topological space and can thus define generalizations of varieties called schemes, which find applications not only in geometry, but also in number theory.

The introduction of prime ideals in algebraic number theory was a major step forward: it was realized that the important property of unique factorisation expressed in the fundamental theorem of arithmetic does not hold in every ring of algebraic integers, but a substitute was found when Richard Dedekind replaced elements by ideals and prime elements by prime ideals; see Dedekind domain.

Prime ideals for noncommutative rings
The notion of a prime ideal can be generalized to noncommutative rings by using the commutative definition "ideal-wise". Wolfgang Krull advanced this idea in 1928. The following content can be found in texts such as Goodearl's and Lam's.

It can be shown that this definition is equivalent to the commutative one in commutative rings. It is readily verified that if an ideal of a noncommutative ring  satisfies the commutative definition of prime, then it also satisfies the noncommutative version. An ideal  satisfying the commutative definition of prime is sometimes called a completely prime ideal to distinguish it from other merely prime ideals in the ring.  Completely prime ideals are prime ideals, but the converse is not true.  For example, the zero ideal in the ring of  matrices over a field is a prime ideal, but it is not completely prime.

This is close to the historical point of view of ideals as ideal numbers, as for the ring  " is contained in " is another way of saying " divides ", and the unit ideal  represents unity.

Equivalent formulations of the ideal  being prime include the following properties:

The following item can then be added to the list of equivalent conditions above:

 The complement  is an m-system.

Examples
 Any primitive ideal is prime.
 As with commutative rings, maximal ideals are prime, and also prime ideals contain minimal prime ideals.
 A ring is a prime ring if and only if the zero ideal is a prime ideal, and moreover a ring is a domain if and only if the zero ideal is a completely prime ideal.

Important facts
Prime avoidance lemma.
Now, if , then , which is a contradiction). Another prototypical m-system is the set,  of all positive powers of a non-nilpotent element.
 For a prime ideal , the complement  has another property beyond being an m-system. A set that contains the divisors of its elements is called saturated.
The intersection of members of a descending chain of prime ideals is a prime ideal, and in a commutative ring the union of members of an ascending chain of prime ideals is a prime ideal. With Zorn's Lemma, these observations imply that the poset of prime ideals of a commutative ring (partially ordered by inclusion) has maximal and minimal elements.

Connection to maximality
Prime ideals can frequently be produced as maximal elements of certain collections of ideals. For example:
 An ideal maximal with respect to having empty intersection with a fixed m-system is prime.
 An ideal maximal among annihilators of submodules of a fixed -module  is prime.
 In a commutative ring, an ideal maximal with respect to being non-principal is prime.
 In a commutative ring, an ideal maximal with respect to being not countably generated is prime.

See also
Radical ideal
Maximal ideal
Dedekind–Kummer theorem

References

Further reading